Compsolechia epibola is a moth of the family Gelechiidae. It was described by Walsingham in 1910. It is found in Mexico (Vera Cruz) and Panama.

The wingspan is about 18 mm. The forewings are ashy grey, with sparsely scattered greyish fuscous speckling, the usual spots are not more noticeable than other specks. Near the base of the dorsum is an outwardly oblique greyish fuscous shade, rising to a little above the fold. A slight clouding of the same colour appears at the commencement of the costal and dorsal cilia respectively, the anteterminal portion of the wing beyond it being slightly paler than the general hue. The hindwings are greyish brown.

References

Moths described in 1910
Compsolechia